is a 1983 Japanese film by director Shōhei Imamura. It stars Sumiko Sakamoto as Orin, Ken Ogata, and Shoichi Ozawa. It is an adaptation of the book Narayama bushikō by Shichirō Fukazawa and slightly inspired by the 1958 film directed by Keisuke Kinoshita. Both films explore the legendary practice of ubasute, in which elderly people were carried to a mountain and abandoned to die. Imamura's film won the Palme d'Or at the 1983 Cannes Film Festival.

Production
The Ballad of Narayama was filmed in Niigata Prefecture and Nagano Prefecture.

Plot 
The film is set in a small rural village in Japan in the 19th century. According to tradition, once a person reaches the age of 70 he or she must travel to a remote mountain to die of starvation, a practice known as ubasute. The story concerns Orin, who is 69 and of sound health, but notes that a neighbor had to drag his father to the mountain, so she resolves to avoid clinging to life beyond her term. She spends a year arranging all the affairs of her family and village: she severely punishes a family who are hoarding food, and helps her younger son lose his virginity.

The film has some harsh scenes that show how brutal the conditions could be for the villagers. Interspersed between episodes in the film are brief vignettes of nature – birds, snakes, and other animals hunting, watching, singing, copulating or giving birth.

Cast
 Ken Ogata – Tatsuhei
 Sumiko Sakamoto – Orin
 Tonpei Hidari – Risuke
 Aki Takejo – Tamayan 
 Shoichi Ozawa – Katsuzō 
 Fujio Tokita – Jinsaku
 Sanshō Shinsui – Zeniya no Matayan
 Seiji Kurasaki – Kesakichi
 Junko Takada – Matsuyan
 Mitsuko Baisho – Oei 
 Taiji Tonoyama – Teruyan
 Casey Takamine – Arayashiki 
 Nenji Kobayashi – Tsune
 Nijiko Kiyokawa – Okane
 Akio Yokoyama – Amaya

Box office

Overseas, the film sold  tickets in the Soviet Union, 844,077 tickets in France upon release in 1983, and 1,696 tickets in the Netherlands, Switzerland and Spain between 1996 and 2018, for a combined estimated total of approximately  tickets sold worldwide.

Awards
Cannes Film Festival (1983)
Palme d'Or
Japan Academy Film Prize (1984)
Best Actor Ken Ogata
Best Film
Best Sound Kenichi Benitani
Blue Ribbon Awards (1984)
Best Actor Ken Ogata
Excellence in Cinematography Award (1984): Masao Tochizawa
Hochi Film Award (1983)
Best Supporting Actress Mitsuko Baisho
Mainichi Film Concours (1984)
Best Actor (Ken Ogata)
Best Sound Recording: Kenichi Benitani

Anecdote
In early 2000s, the movie had a chance to be released in China, on condition that the sex scenes were censored. The director Imamura consulted some Chinese directors. They replied that the sex scenes were necessary contrast to the scenes of death. Imamura decided to turn down the proposal.

Home media
The Ballad of Narayama was released on DVD by Umbrella Entertainment in May 2010. The DVD is compatible with all region codes and includes special features such as the theatrical trailer.

References

Bibliography

External links 
 
 
 

Japanese comedy-drama films
Films directed by Shohei Imamura
1983 films
1983 comedy-drama films
Remakes of Japanese films
Palme d'Or winners
1980s Japanese-language films
Films set in the 19th century
Films set in Japan
Toei Company films
Picture of the Year Japan Academy Prize winners
Films based on Japanese novels
Films about death
1983 comedy films
1983 drama films
1980s Japanese films